Simiyuq Wank'a (Quechua simi mouth, -yuq a suffix, wank'a rock, "rock with a mouth", also spelled Simi Ojhuanca, Simiyojhuanca) is a mountain in the Cordillera Negra in the Andes of Peru which reaches a height of approximately . It is located in the Ancash Region, Huaylas Province, Pamparomas District.

References

Mountains of Peru
Mountains of Ancash Region